This article covers the various forms of transport in the United Arab Emirates (UAE), by road, rail, air, water, etc.

Roads
In the UAE, they drive on the right. In the old days, it was a British protectorate and they used to drive on the left, but later they swapped to the right. The United Arab Emirates have an extensive and well-developed road network, principally in the northern coastal area where the main population centres are located. Many of these roads have been improved to become multi-lane dual-carriageway motorways, coping with the high demand for road transportation.

Heavy trucks and buses are installed with speed limiters to prevent overspeeding.

In 2006 UAE have a score of 190 killed per million population in traffic collisions linked to high speeds and poor safety culture.

In 2010, UAE have a score near of 100 killed per million population in traffic collisions.

In 2013, UAE have a score near of 109 killed per million population in traffic collisions, as estimated by the WHO

Between 2014 and 2018 peopled killed by traffic has drop by 34%.

List of motorways
E10 Abu Dhabi – Al Shahama. Length: .
E11 Al Silaa – Al Qir. Length: . This is the most important motorway of the country, stretching from Saudi Arabia to Oman, connecting Abu Dhabi, Dubai, Sharjah, Umm al-Quwain, Ras al-Khaimah, and other important centres.
E12 Abu Dhabi – Al Falah. Length: .
E15 Ruways – Wasit Oasis. Length: .
E16 Al Rahba – Al Saad. Length: .
E18 Ras Al Khaimah – Al Manama. Length: .
E20 Abu Dhabi – Al Hayer. Length: .
E22 Abu Dhabi – Al Ain. Length: .
E30 (Abu Dhabi - Al Ain Road; parallel to E 22 Road)
E44 Dubai–Hatta. Length: .
E45 Tarif–Liwa. Length: .
E55 Umm al-Quwain – Al Shuwaib. Length: .
E66 Dubai – Al Ain. Length: .
E75 Saih Sheib – Al Fayah Truck Road 
E77 (Expo Road/Jabal Ali-Lahbab Road). Length: 54 km (33 mi).
E84 Al Malaiha – Fujairah. Length: .
E88 Sharjah – Masafi. Length: .
E89 Diba al Fujairah – Fujairah. Length: .
E99 Diba al Fujairah – Kalba. Length: .
E102 Sharjah – Kalba. Length: .
E311 Abu Dhabi – Ras al Khaimah. Length: .
E611 Dubai – Umm al-Quwain. Also known as Emirates Road, formerly Dubai Bypass Road. Length: .

Major accidents
Six people were killed, at least 40 were injured and dozens of vehicles burned March 11, 2008 when hundreds of cars collided on a fog-shrouded Abu Dhabi–Dubai highway.

Buses

Bus services were introduced in Abu Dhabi by the Emirate in 2008 with four routes which were zero fare in their pilot year. At the end of 2011, bus services in the Emirate of Abu Dhabi provided more than 95 service routes with 650 buses to transport 50 million passengers in the region. In the Bus Network Plan in 2013, 14 bus routes were operated in Abu Dhabi City.

In Dubai, the Roads and Transport Authority (RTA) operates bus services under the name DubaiBus. Buses in Sharjah are operated by Mowasalat, and in Ajman by Ajman bus. There are also buses operating between the different Emirates due to the lack of rail connectivity, although this is planned to be rectified in the near future.

Transport payment systems
Fares on Abu Dhabi buses are paid by the Hafilat Card since 2015, which is a contactless smart card to be flashed when entering and exiting the bus at mini-terminals inside of the bus. It is currently only available for bus travellers but will gradually be expanded into the water transport systems and the planned Abu Dhabi Metro, Etihad Rail and the Abu Dhabi Tram System. The Ojra card is used by frequent travellers.
The Nol card is a contactless smart card used for Public Transport in Dubai. It is also used for payment on buses between Dubai and other cities.

Taxis 

Taxis in the UAE accept card payments.

Rail

Etihad Rail is a state-owned company, and is the national railway company. It was set up in 2009 to manage a national-level freight and passenger rail network within the country, and later to other nations of the Gulf Cooperation Council as part of Gulf Railway. The first phase of the system is complete and freight service has begun. The second phase will connect the railway to Mussafah, Khalifa and Jebel Ali ports in Dubai, and is planned to connect to the Saudi and Omani borders. In January 2016, construction of phase two was suspended for re-evaluation, while service on phase one continued. Costing approximately US$10 billion, the three-stage rail system is planned to have  of railway connecting cities in UAE and linking to other Gulf countries. Abu Dhabi, Al Ain, Dubai, Sharjah, Fujairah, Ras Al Khaimah and Khor Fakkan will be linked by Etihad Rail when construction is completed.

The Dubai Metro has operated since 2009, and the Abu Dhabi Metro is currently under construction.

The Dubai Tram was launched in November 2014, and operates mainly in the Dubai Marina with new stations being constructed. Another tram system is being planned for Sharjah and Ajman.

Air
The General Civil Aviation Authority (GCAA) started applying an advanced program in 2010 that allows the assessment of aircraft registered in foreign countries in order to ensure their safety and airworthiness. In 2011, it banned all aircraft registered in Congo DR, Eswatini, Equatorial Guinea, Sierra Leone and São Tomé and Príncipe due to their poor safety standards.

Airports

Dubai International Airport was the busiest airport in the world by international passenger traffic in 2014.  Abu Dhabi International Airport is the second-largest airport in the UAE.

There are 42 airports in the UAE  

Heliports:
Five are known

Airlines

Emirates is the biggest national airline of the UAE and is owned by Dubai. Etihad Airways is the second-largest national airline and is owned by Abu Dhabi. Other airlines are flyDubai, Air Arabia and Royal Jet.

Pipelines
Crude oil, 
Natural gas, including natural gas liquids,

Ports and harbours
The major ports are Khalifa Port, Zayed Port, Port of Jebel Ali, Port Rashid, Port Khalid, Port Saeed, and Container Port Khor Fakkan. Other ports include Fujairah Port (a bunkering port), Das Island (tanker port).

Merchant marine

bulk, 1
cargo, 18
chemical tanker, 3
container, 8
liquified gas, 1
livestock carrier, 1
passenger, 1
petroleum tanker, 27
roll-on/roll-off, 7
specialized tanker, 1

See also

 Transportation in Dubai

References

External links